The Mircea Druc Cabinet was the cabinet of Moldova (May 25, 1990 – May 28, 1991).

In April, the Popular Front of Moldova won the 1990 parliamentary election. On May 24, 1990, the Mircea Druc Cabinet received the vote of confidence from the Parliament of Moldova, with 259 votes and 1 abstain.

Membership

Prime Minister of Moldova 
Mircea Druc (25 May 1990 - 28 May 1991)

Deputy prime-minister, Finance Minister
Valeriu Muravschi (6 June 1990 - 28 May 1991)

Foreign Minister of Moldova 
Nicolae Ţîu (6 June 1990 - 28 May 1991)

Industry Minister
Alexandru Ion Barbu (9 iulie 1991 - ?)

Minister of Agriculture and Food Industry
Andrei Sangheli (6 June 1990 - 28 May 1991)

Minister of Education
Nicolae Mătcaş (?)

Minister of Culture
Ion Ungureanu (6 June 1990 - 28 May 1991)

Health Minister
Gheorghe Ghidirim (?)

Justice Minister 
Alexei Barbăneagră (6 June 1990 - 28 May 1991)

Minister of national security (preşedinte al Comitetului pentru Securitatea Statului)
Tudor Botnaru (6 June 1990 - 28 May 1991)

Minister of Internal Affairs of Moldova
General Ion Costaş (6 June 1990 - 28 May 1991)

External links
Decretul nr. 12 din 25 ianuarie 1997 privind numirea Guvernului

Notes

Moldova cabinets
Popular Front of Moldova
1990 establishments in the Moldavian Soviet Socialist Republic
1991 disestablishments in the Moldavian Soviet Socialist Republic
Cabinets established in 1990
Cabinets disestablished in 1991